Joyce Roberts (married name Joyce Miller), is a female English former international table tennis player.

Table tennis career
She won a bronze medal in the 1951 World Table Tennis Championships in the Corbillon Cup (women's team event) with Peggy Franks, Diane Rowe and Rosalind Rowe for England.

Personal life
In September 1949 she married English table tennis player Anthony 'Tony' Miller.

See also
 List of England players at the World Team Table Tennis Championships
 List of World Table Tennis Championships medalists

References

English female table tennis players
World Table Tennis Championships medalists